The Revista Colombiana de Química (English: Colombian Journal of Chemistry) is an open access peer-reviewed scientific journal on chemistry published by the National University of Colombia. It publishes original contributions of applied and basic research on chemistry, including analytical, organic, inorganic, bio-, and physical chemistry. Articles are published in Spanish, with abstracts translated into English and Portuguese.

Abstracting and indexing 
The Revista Colombiana de Química is abstracted and indexed in Chemical Abstracts, Scopus, SciELO, Latindex, and Publindex (category A2).

References 
 Scielo entry
 Latindex entry
 Category A2 Publindex

External links 
  

Chemistry journals
Open access journals
Spanish-language journals
Triannual journals
Publications established in 1971
National University of Colombia academic journals